The 1888–89 Rugby Union County Championship was the inaugural edition of England's premier rugby union club competition at the time.

Yorkshire won the competition for the first time. They were declared the champion county after finishing the season undefeated and were selected to play the Rest of England in the end of season county fixtures. 

Squad
Harry Bedford (Morley)
Fred Bonsor (capt) (Bradford)
A L Brooke (Huddersfield)
J Dodd (Halifax)
Thomas Else (Batley)
John Lawrence Hickson (Bradford)
Edgar Holmes (Manningham)
George Jacketts (Hull)
J H Jones (Wakefield Trinity)
Donald Jowett (Heckmondwike)
Richard Lockwood (Dewsbury)
Frederick Lowrie (Wakefield Trinity)
Rawson Robertshaw (Bradford)
William Stadden (Dewsbury)
J W Sykes (Batley)
John Willie Sutcliffe (Heckmondwike)
John Toothill (Bradford)
Harry Wilkinson (Halifax)

See also
 English rugby union system
 Rugby union in England

References

Rugby Union County Championship
County Championship (rugby union) seasons